Bapsy Jain is an Indian entrepreneur and author of the novel Lucky Everyday, which portrays the spiritual journey of a woman faced with surprising life challenges.

Biography 
Bapsy Jain was born in Calcutta, India. She completed her schooling from Presentation Convent, Kodaikanal and graduated from the Sydenham College of Commerce and Economics, Mumbai. She then left for the UK to further pursue her education in finance and became a member of The Institute of Chartered Accountants in England & Wales.

She married Nitish Jain on 23 November 1985 and they have two sons. Together Bapsy and Nitish Jain have set up business schools under the name of S P Jain School of Global Management in Dubai, Mumbai, Singapore and Sydney.  A period of forced bed rest allowed her to start writing and led to her first book Lucky Everyday.

Writing career 
Jain worked for ten years on her debut novel, The Blind Pilgrim, published by Penguin. After the book became a bestseller in India, Penguin acquired world rights for the book in March 2009 and subsequently published the book worldwide under a new title, Lucky Everyday. In 2015 she published a sequel titled A Star Called Lucky. Publishers Weekly called the first novel "overstuffed" and the ending "disappointing" but was somewhat kinder to the "amiable sequel".

Lucky Everyday 
Lucky Everyday concerns itself with the human spirit’s ability to adjust to the challenges of life.  Named a bestseller by Mike Bryan, CEO and President, Penguin Books, it follows the character Lucky Boyce as she transitions from being a professional working in New York to becoming the wife of a wealthy Indian businessman and then on to leading the life of a divorced teacher of yoga.

References

External links
 Penguin Books page for Lucky Everyday (archived in 2009)
 Bapsy Jain's blog
 Official website for Blind Pilgrim (archived in 2011)
 Official website for A Star Called Lucky

Living people
Indian women novelists
Writers from Kolkata
Year of birth missing (living people)